Newin Chidchob (born 4 October 1958) is a Thai politician from Buriram Province. As a member of several political parties, Newin and his allies eventually joined the Thai Rak Thai Party of Thaksin Shinawatra in 2005. Prior to the 2006 Thai coup d'état, he served as a member of the Parliament for Buriram Province and was a Cabinet minister with the Thai Rak Thai party. From 2002 to 2005, he was Deputy Minister of Agriculture and Agricultural Cooperatives.

Following the 2006 Thai coup d'état and the subsequent dissolution of Thai Rak Thai for corruption, Newin and his friends, mostly members of the National Assembly from the south of Isan (the northeastern region), shifted from the ruling (now also dissolved) People Power Party (PPP) to the opposition Democrat Party during the 2008 Thai political crisis. He is the leader of the so-called "Friends of Newin Group", now known as the Bhumjaithai Party. Consequently, a Democrat Party led coalition gained the majority in the National Assembly. Abhisit Vejjajiva, the Democrat Party's leader, was elected by a majority of the Parliament to be the new prime minister in December 2008.

During the political tension in April 2009 caused by pro-Thaksin groups widely known as the Red Shirts, Newin publicly blasted Thaksin, his former 'boss', as the root of the political tension due to his 'doubts' of Thaksin's loyalty towards the monarchy and the current political system of the kingdom. Previously in 2008, Newin had wept with Thaksin when the former PM kissed the tarmac at Suvarnabhumi airport after returning to Thailand after a self-imposed exile.

Newin was named after the Burmese leader Ne Win.

Early life and education
Born to a former Speakers of the House of Representatives, Chai Chidchob, a Thai Khmer-Chinese Cambodian background, many of his ancestors were elephant drivers (mahouts), and a housewife, La-on Chidchob, Chinese Cambodian background, he was the third child of six siblings.

Niwin graduated grade 7 from Trai Kham School and went on to complete secondary education from Suankularb Wittayalai School. He have famous classmates such as Watana Muangsook, Wira Somkhid, Somchai Srisutthiyakon and Somsak Jeamteerasakul.

Later, continuing to complete his diploma in Community Development Program from Buriram Rajabhat Institute in 1987 and graduated in bachelor's degree of Agriculture and Cooperative Promotion Program from Sukhothai Thammathirat Open University. In addition, he received an honorary degree in public administration from the Pacific Western University, Western Hawaii, USA.

Crimes and punishments 
On 19 June 1998, the Buriram Provincial Court handed Newin a suspended six-month jail sentence and a ฿50,000 fine in a vote-buying slander case filed by Democrat MP Karun Sai-ngam. A year later, the Constitutional Court ruled 7-6 that Newin could keep his ministerial post.

Newin was acquitted in 2009 of involvement in the rubber sapling scandal for bid rigging, corruption and collusion.

In 2007 Newin was banned from politics for five years for being an executive of the disbanded Thai Rak Thai Party, however he continues to be active in politics despite the ban, famously engineering a coalition government with his group and the Democrat Party.

Later life 
In December 2009, it was announced Newin take over PEA F.C. and rename in Buriram PEA F.C until 2012 to rename again Buriram United F.C.

References

 Official profile at the Thai Cabinet website and cache of the Thai Cabinet website

1958 births
Living people
Newin Chidchob
Newin Chidchob
Newin Chidchob
Newin Chidchob
Newin Chidchob
Newin Chidchob
Newin Chidchob
Newin Chidchob
Newin Chidchob
Newin Chidchob
Newin Chidchob
Newin Chidchob